Ukrainian Revolution may refer to:
Khmelnytsky Uprising (1648–1657)
Ukraine after the Russian Revolution (1917–1920)
Ukrainian War of Independence (1917–1921)
Ukrainian–Soviet War (1917–1921)
Polish–Ukrainian War (1918–1919)
Act of restoration of the Ukrainian state (1941)
Declaration of Independence of Ukraine (1991)
Orange Revolution (2004–2005)
Revolution of Dignity (2014)